Amiga World was a magazine dedicated to the Amiga computer platform. It was a prominent Amiga magazine, particularly in the United States, and was published by Massachusetts-based IDG Publishing from 1985 until April 1995. The first several issues were distributed before the computer was available for sale to the public. Issue 3 (Vol 2 No 1, January 1986) featured the artist Andy Warhol. The headquarters of the magazine later moved to Peterborough, New Hampshire.

See also
 RUN, the parent magazine from which Amiga World was spun off.
 Amiga Survivor

References

External links
 Amiga World Animation Video Vol. 1 from 1990 on youtube.com

1985 establishments in Massachusetts
1995 disestablishments in New Hampshire
Amiga magazines
Defunct computer magazines published in the United States
Magazines established in 1985
Magazines disestablished in 1995
Magazines published in Massachusetts
Magazines published in New Hampshire